Apus is a constellation.

Apus or APUS may also refer to:
 Apus (bird), a genus of birds
 Lepidurus apus, a species of crustacean in the genus Lepidurus
 APUS (computer), an Amiga computer brand
 AP United States History (AP US), an American college-level course and examination
 APUS Group, an Android developer
 American Public University System, an online learning institution

See also
 APU (disambiguation)